Velda is a name given to the hypothetical ancestress of the Cantabrian people and Haplogroup V (mtDNA).

Velda may also refer to:

 The secretary and love interest of the crime fiction character Mike Hammer
 Kay Velda (born 1990), Dutch footballer

See also